The 2003 Champ Car World Series, the twenty-fifth and final in the CART-era of American open-wheel car racing, consisted of 18 races,  beginning in St. Petersburg, Florida on February 23 and concluding in Surfers Paradise, Queensland, Australia on October 26. For sponsorship purposes, it was branded as Bridgestone Presents the Champ Car World Series Powered by Ford.

The intended final event, scheduled to be held in Fontana, California on November 9 was canceled due to wildfires, one of which was known as the "Grand Prix Fire", burning in and around San Bernardino County.

The Drivers' Champion was Paul Tracy. Rookie of the Year was Sébastien Bourdais. At the end of the season, the operations of a now bankrupt CART were assumed by Open-Wheel Racing Series, who continued to brand its top series as the Champ Car World Series.

The season was the first since 1993 not to feature Michael Andretti.

Drivers and teams 
With the departure of Honda and Toyota to the Indy Racing League for the 2003 season, Cosworth became the exclusive engine supplier for the CART series.  Their 2.65L XFE turbo V8 powerplant continued to be badged by Ford. Bridgestone continued on as an exclusive tire supplier for the series. Starting in 2003, CART began branding itself as the Champ Car World Series, and a marketing agreement between CART and the two suppliers resulted in the full branding of "Bridgestone Presents the Champ Car World Series Powered by Ford."

The following teams and drivers competed in the 2003 Champ Car World Series season.

Team changes 
With the departure of Honda and Toyota to the Indy Racing League for the 2003 season, four CART teams joined them in the rival series as well. Chip Ganassi Racing, Andretti Green Racing (a merger of the former Team Green and Michael Andretti's Team Motorola) and Mo Nunn Racing became full-time IRL competitors for the 2003 season. Meanwhile, Mi-Jack Conquest Racing  went against flow and jumped from the IRL to CART. Team Rahal and Fernández Racing split their efforts between the two series, each reducing their Champ Car teams to a single car. Dale Coyne Racing returned to full-time status after a partial season effort in 2002.

Four new teams joined the series. Businessman Kevin Kalkhoven and Craig Pollock, who previously managed the British American Racing Formula One team, started the PK Racing team.  Long-time Trans-Am competitor Paul Gentilozzi expanded his Rocketsports Racing team to include a Champ Car effort.  Kalkhoven and Gentilozzi would go on to become two of the owners of the series in 2004 after the CART organization went bankrupt. Formula One and Champ Car champion Emerson Fittipaldi and businessman Jamie Dingman formed Fittipaldi-Dingman Racing while Formula One and Champ Car veteran Stefan Johansson formed American Spirit Team Johansson.

Driver changes 
Along with the major changes to the team lineup to the series, a great many new faces made their debut in 2003. Of the nineteen drivers at the season opener in St. Petersburg, nine were rookies.  Most notable was 2002 Formula 3000 champion Sébastien Bourdais who joined Newman/Haas Racing. Bourdais would impress immediately by taking pole in his first race, winning his fourth race, and finishing fourth in the season championship. Walker Racing had a lineup of two rookies, Rodolfo Lavín and Darren Manning, who actually debuted at the 2002 race at the Rockingham Motor Speedway in England but was still considered a series rookie.  Three rookie teams campaigned with rookie drivers. Fittipaldi-Dingman Racing ran Tiago Monteiro, Mi-Jack Conquest Racing chose Mario Haberfeld, while PK Racing began the year with Patrick Lemarié.

Familiar Champ Car drivers also found themselves in new surroundings for 2003. With Chip Ganassi Racing gone to the IRL, Bruno Junqueira took over the #1 car at Newman-Haas, replacing Cristiano da Matta who moved on to Formula One after winning the 2002 CART season. With Team Green also gone to the IRL, Paul Tracy moved over to Team Player's.  Tracy would reward his new team with the season championship.  Alex Tagliani lost his Player's seat to Tracy but found a ride with the new Rocketsports Racing team. Champ Car's elder statesman Jimmy Vasser joined the new American Spirit Team Johansson team after Team Rahal downsized to a single car. His teammate there was series rookie Ryan Hunter-Reay. Herdez Competition tabbed veteran Roberto Moreno for their expanded two car team.

The list of drivers not changing teams was short. Patrick Carpentier at Player's, Mario Domínguez at Herdez, Michel Jourdain Jr. at Team Rahal, Oriol Servia at Patrick Racing, and Adrian Fernández continued to drive his own car.

Mid-season changes 
 Former Formula One pay driver Alex Yoong took over the Dale Coyne Racing #11 car from Roberto González starting with the 2nd race of the season in Monterrey.
 Sponsorship problems caused Yoong to lose his race seat to Champ Car veteran Gualter Salles at Milwaukee. This marked Salles's first Champ Car start since Road America in August 2000.
 After a series of disappointing results to open the season, PK Racing replaced Patrick Lemarié with noted Laguna Seca expert Brian Herta for the race there. Herta's full-time job in 2003 was driving in the IRL for Andretti Green Racing so Max Papis took over the car starting with the following round at Portland.
 Also at Laguna, the revolving door at Coyne continued with Geoff Boss taking over the #11 from Salles.
 The shuffle at Coyne did not stop at Portland as Gualter Salles returned, taking over the #19 car from Joël Camathias. Salles remained in the #19 for the rest of the year with two exceptions: Alex Sperafico took over the car at Toronto and Miami because Salles had previous commitments those weekends.
 PK Racing brought in Formula One veteran Mika Salo for the final four races of the year starting with the race in Denver.
 Two extra Mexican drivers were brought in for the race in Mexico City. Herdez Competition gave away Roberto Moreno's car to Roberto González for the race, while Walker Racing ran a third car for Luis Díaz.

Season summary

Schedule 

 Oval/Speedway
 Dedicated road course
 Temporary street circuit

Race results

Final driver standings

Nation's Cup 

 Top result per race counts towards Nation's Cup.

Chassis Constructor's Cup

Driver breakdown 

* Alex Tagliani started on pole at Milwaukee but was not awarded the bonus point for it when the qualification session was rained out. The grid was set by practice times. This result is not counted in Tagliani's season total in this table.

See also
 2003 Toyota Atlantic Championship season
 2003 Indianapolis 500
 2003 IndyCar Series
 2003 Infiniti Pro Series season

Notes

References
 
 
 
 
 

Champ Car seasons
CART
CART
 
CART